The 2010 Arctic Winter Games were held in Grande Prairie, Alberta, Canada from March 6 to 13th.

The Arctic Winter Games is an international biannual celebration of circumpolar sports and culture, held in Canada or Alaska.

Over 2,000 athletes from nine teams (Alaska, Alberta North, Yukon, Yamal-Nenets, Northwest Territories, Greenland, Nunavik Québec, Nunavut and Saami) participated in the games.

Sports included alpine skiing, arctic sports, badminton, basketball, biathlon, curling, dene games, dog mushing, figure skating, freestyle skiing, gymnastics, hockey, indoor soccer, snowboarding, snowshoeing, speed skating, table tennis, volleyball and wrestling.

Medal tally

See also
2006 Arctic Winter Games
2008 Arctic Winter Games

References

External links
Arctic Winter Games Official Site
Arctic Winter Games 2010
Honourable Lunn’s Statement On The 2010 Arctic Winter Games Closing

Arctic Winter Games
Arctic Winter Games
Arctic Winter Games
Sport in Grande Prairie
Winter multi-sport events in Canada
Arctic Winter